The Egyptian Theatre is a historic movie theatre in Coos Bay, Oregon, United States.

History
The Egyptian was built by Charles Noble, a descendant of one of the area's first settlers, in 1922. He spent $200,000 to convert the garage into the theater in 1925. The building was designed by Lee Arden Thomas and Albert Mercier and includes piers decorated with papyrus blossoms, wrought-iron ceiling lights in the form of hooded cobras, and stairways with  pharaoh statues. The main theatre seats 770 and is an example of the Egyptian Theatre style of Egyptian Revival architecture that was popular in the early 20th century in the U.S., especially following the 1922 discovery of the tomb of King Tut. The theatre also has all of its original vaudeville backdrops. The theatre originally had one screen but the balcony was converted to house two screens in 1976, increasing the seating capacity to 1,000.

In 2000, the Egyptian housed the only theatre organ still in its original theatre in Oregon, a 4/18 Mighty Wurlitzer pipe organ. In 2010, it was one of four remaining theatres in the Egyptian Revival style in the United States and began inviting the community to use the facility for meetings, concerts, plays, and other events. The building was listed on the U.S. National Register of Historic Places on May 24, 2010.  With unfunded $3 million renovations needed, the theatre was one of ten entries on the Historic Preservation League of Oregon's Most Endangered Places in Oregon list in 2011.

See also
Grauman's Egyptian Theatre
Peery's Egyptian Theatre,
Mary G. Steiner Egyptian Theatre
The Egyptian Theatre (Boise, Idaho)
Egyptian Theatre (DeKalb, Illinois)
List of Oregon's Most Endangered Places

References

External links
The Egyptian Theatre at cinematreasures.com
Color photo of the Egyptian from exithere.net
Color photo of The Egyptian by John Varley's wife Lee (several interior shots on their website as well)

Egyptian-style theaters
Coos Bay, Oregon
Theatres on the National Register of Historic Places in Oregon
Egyptian Revival architecture in the United States
Buildings and structures in Coos County, Oregon
National Register of Historic Places in Coos County, Oregon
1925 establishments in Oregon
Public venues with a theatre organ
Oregon's Most Endangered Places